Esbae: A Winter's Tale is a novel by Linda Haldeman published in 1981.

Plot summary
Esbae: A Winter's Tale is a novel in which a student named Chuck summons the demon Asmodeus.

Reception
Greg Costikyan reviewed Esbae: A Winter's Tale in Ares Magazine #13 and commented that "The premise of the novel may sound silly, but Haldeman handles it well. Esbae is permeated with a vision of college life that seems like something from a better, bygone era: professors puffing contentedly on pipes, enthusiastic student choirs, red-cheeked students frolicking in the snow."

Reviews
Review by Faren Miller (1981) in Locus, #250 November 1981 
Review by Ann Collier (1982) in Vector 107 
Review by Barry N. Malzberg (1982) in The Magazine of Fantasy & Science Fiction, June 1982

References

1981 novels